The 2020–21 Waasland-Beveren season was the club's 85th season in existence and its ninth season in the top flight of Belgian football. In addition to the domestic league, Waasland-Beveren participated in this season's edition of the Belgian Cup. The season covered the period from 3 August 2020 to 30 June 2021.

Players

First-team squad
As of 28 February 2021

Out on loan

Transfers

In

Out

Pre-season and friendlies

Competitions

Overview

Belgian First Division A

League table

Results summary

Results by round

Matches
The league fixtures were announced on 8 July 2020.

Relegation play-off

Belgian Cup

Statistics

Squad appearances and goals
Last updated on 9 August 2020.

|-
! colspan=14 style=background:#dcdcdc; text-align:center|Goalkeepers

|-
! colspan=14 style=background:#dcdcdc; text-align:center|Defenders

|-
! colspan=14 style=background:#dcdcdc; text-align:center|Midfielders

|-
! colspan=14 style=background:#dcdcdc; text-align:center|Forwards

|-
! colspan=14 style=background:#dcdcdc; text-align:center|Players who have made an appearance this season but have left the club
|}

Goalscorers

References

External links

S.K. Beveren
Waasland-Beveren